Grove is a small lunar impact crater that lies in the northern part of the Lacus Somniorum. It is located to the southeast of the crater remnant Mason. Grove is a relatively circular crater formation with a simple, sharp-edged rim. The unconsolidated material along the inner wall has slumped down to the floor, forming a ring around the relatively level base. The floor contains a few tiny impacts, but is otherwise nearly featureless.

Satellite craters
By convention these features are identified on lunar maps by placing the letter on the side of the crater midpoint that is closest to Grove.

References

 
 
 
 
 
 
 
 
 
 
 
 

Impact craters on the Moon